197th Division may refer to:

197th Division (People's Republic of China)
197th Infantry Division (German Empire)
197th Infantry Division (Wehrmacht)

Military units and formations disambiguation pages